John Devakumar 'Shaw' Wilson (born 4 September 1944) is a Sri Lankan educator and former first-class cricketer.

Wilson was born at Jaffna in September 1944. He was educated in Colombo at Royal College, where he captained the scholl cricket team. From there, he went up to Senate of Serampore College in India, where he obtained his bachelor's degree. He then studied for his master's degree at the University of London and Princeton Theological Seminary. Wilson spent time as a research student at Mansfield College at the University of Oxford. While studying at Oxford, he made a single appearance in first-class cricket for Oxford University against Nottinghamshire at Oxford in 1977. Batting twice in the match, he was dismissed for 18 runs in the Oxford first innings by Peter Hacker, while in their second innings he was dismissed without scoring by Bob White.

Once Wilson had completed his studies, he returned to Sri Lanka to become a schoolteacher. He taught at Trinity College in Kandy, where he was also curator of the college's Asgiriya cricket ground, which became Sri Lanka's second Test venue in 1983 when Sri Lanka played Australia there. He later taught at several schools in Australia, before returning to Sri Lanka to teach. In 2015, he became the vice-principal of Wesley College, Colombo. He was appointed vice principle of Trinity College in April 2017.

References

External links

1944 births
Living people
People from Jaffna
Alumni of Royal College, Colombo
Senate of Serampore College (University) alumni
Alumni of the University of London
Princeton Theological Seminary alumni
Alumni of Mansfield College, Oxford
Sri Lankan cricketers
Oxford University cricketers
Sri Lankan Tamil teachers
Cricket curators
People from British Ceylon